Lifelong Learning Networks (LLNs) were a joint initiative in the UK between the Higher Education Funding Council for England (HEFCE), the Learning and Skills Council (LSC) and the former Department for Education and Skills (DfES). They were created as a result of HEFCE/LSC Circular Letter 12/2004.

In June 2004, they invited Further Education Colleges (FECs) and Higher Education Institutions (HEIs) to forge partnerships, bringing together different types of learning provider in a single network. These networks would provide fresh opportunities for progression to higher education for vocational and work-based learners, supporting vocational education, learner development and lifelong learning.

Higher York, the country's first LLN, hosts the Lifelong Learning Network National Forum - an initiative designed to promote good practice and sharing ideas between the different LLNs across the country.

See also 

 Higher Futures - LLN for South Yorkshire, North Derbyshire and North Nottinghamshire

External links 
 HEFCE
 LLN National Forum
 Greater Manchester Strategic Alliance
 Birmingham Black Country and Solihull LLN
 Greater Merseyside and West Lancashire LLN
 Hampshire and Isle of Wight LLN
 Herefordshire and Worcestershire LLN
 Higher Futures
 Higher York
 Leap Ahead
 Linking London
 MOVE
 National Arts Learning Network
 Skills for Sustainable Communities
 South West LLN
 Sussex Learning Network
 The Creative Way
 West London LLN
 Western Vocational LLN
 Yorkshire and Humber East LLN
 Coventry and Warwickshire Lifelong Learning Network (CWLLN)

Vocational education in the United Kingdom